The San Juanico Bridge is part of the Pan-Philippine Highway and stretches from Samar to Leyte across the San Juanico Strait in the Philippines. Its longest length is a steel girder viaduct built on reinforced concrete piers, and its main span is of an arch-shaped truss design. Constructed during the administration of President Ferdinand Marcos through Japanese Official Development Assistance loans, it has a total length of —the second longest bridge spanning a body of seawater in the Philippines after Cebu-Cordova Bridge.

Marcos built the bridge as a personal gift to his wife Imelda using public funds siphoned through the controversial Marcos Japanese ODA scandal.. It was one of the high-visibility foreign-loan projects initiated by Marcos during the run-up to the 1969 presidential election. Completed four years later, it was inaugurated on 2 July 1973 on the birthday of Imelda Marcos. Upon its completion, economists and public works engineers quickly tagged it as a white elephant which was "a possession that is useless and expensive to maintain or difficult to dispose of", because its average daily traffic was too low to justify the cost of its construction.

In the years after the Marcos conjugal dictatorship, economic activity in Samar and Leyte has finally caught up with the bridge's intended function under the guidance of several administrations from Corazon Aquino to the present administration, and has become an iconic tourist attraction.

History

Development

Inception 
The "Philippine-Japan Friendship Highway Bridge" was part of a large bundle of high-visibility foreign-loan-funded infrastructure launched by President Ferdinand Marcos' administration during the 1969 presidential election campaign. These foreign-loan-funded showcases, which also included the Cultural Center of the Philippines, allowed Marcos to credit the projects as part of his administration's "performance"—part of the reason he became the first and only president of the Third Philippine Republic to win a second term.

At the time the project was conceived, there was not yet much traffic between the islands of Leyte and Samar because they were relatively underdeveloped, As a result, there was not yet a need for such a costly project funded by foreign loans that would charge interest. Nonetheless, the bridge was built because Marcos' wife Imelda, who had grown up in Leyte, wanted a bridge for her province.

Financing 
The Philippine-Japan Friendship Highway project started out in the mid-1960s with a single US$25 million Japan Export-Import Bank loan meant for the purchase of equipment for road development. However, the Marcos administration requested its expansion to incorporate a bridge between Leyte and Samar, and various sea traffic projects such as roll-on/roll-off ferries.

This was the first Official Development Assistance from Japan to the Philippines through JICA.

Contract awarding 
Through the Ministry of Public Highways, the Philippine government contracted the San Juanico Bridge project to the Construction and Development Corporation of the Philippines (CDCP; now the Philippine National Construction Corporation), a company founded by close Marcos associate Rodolfo Cuenca.

Construction 

Construction of the bridge commenced during 1969 presidential campaign. It was finally completed four years later, in 1973, and was inaugurated on 2 July—in celebration of Imelda Marcos' birthday.

The bridge's design reflected the aesthetic of other infrastructure projects associated with what has been called the Marcoses' "edifice complex"—described by architectural historian Gerard Lico as "an obsession and compulsion to build edifices as a hallmark of greatness".

Post-construction

According to former National Economic and Development Authority deputy director Ruperto Alonzo, the project was initially a white elephant that was "a possession that is useless and expensive to maintain or difficult to dispose of", because its average daily traffic was too low to justify the cost of its construction. As a result, its construction has been associated with what has been called the Marcoses' "edifice complex".

In the years after the Marcos administration, economic activity in Samar and Leyte finally caught up with the bridge's intended function under the guidance of several administrations from Corazon Aquino to the present administration, and has become an iconic tourist attraction.

The bridge was slightly damaged by Typhoon Haiyan, locally known as Super Typhoon Yolanda, in November 2013 but was quickly repaired and reopened within the month.

Samar Governor Sharee Ann Tan proposed a project to install LED lights in the bridge, with timed lighting effects for select occasions as an effort to boost tourism between Leyte and Samar islands. The  project dubbed as the San Juanico Bridge Lighting Project was approved by the Tourism Infrastructure and Enterprise Zone Authority in January 2018. The implementation of the lighting project has experienced delays. The groundbreaking for the project took place on 26 July 2019, with completion projected for December 2019 or January 2020. The completion of the project however has been delayed. Led by President Bongbong Marcos, the bridge was successfully lit up for the first time on 20 October 2022.

Features

The San Juanico Bridge connects the islands of Leyte and Samar by linking the city of Tacloban to the town of Santa Rita, Samar. It passes over the San Juanico Strait.

The bridge's abutments are founded on steel H-piles while its piers are rock seated pedestals built using the Prepakt method, having single cylindrical shafts and tapered cantilevered copings.

The bridge is part of the Pan–Philippine Highway (commonly known as the Maharlika Highway), a network of roads, bridges, and sea routes that connect the islands of Luzon, Samar, Leyte, and Mindanao in the country. The highway was proposed in 1965, and constructed under the administration of President Marcos to serve as the country's backbone of transportation.

Economic significance

The bridge is considered by the government as a main tourist destination of Tacloban. The San Juanico Bridge also serves as an important role for both the tourism and economies of the islands of Samar and Leyte by linking them.

In popular culture

Martial Law slang 

During martial law in the Philippines under then-president Ferdinand E. Marcos, military personnel who conducted tortures referred to one particular method of torture as "the San Juanico Bridge". It involved a person being beaten while the victim's head and feet lay on separate beds and the body is suspended as though to form a bridge.

Film and literature 
Filipino actor and stunt performer Dante Varona jumped from the San Juanico Bridge without a harness in the 1981 movie Hari ng Stunt.

The short story "The Bridge" by Yvette Tan is based on one of the urban legends surrounding the San Juanico Bridge. The story won an award for fiction from the Philippine Graphic.

Urban legends 
There are a number of urban legends associated with the bridge's construction. The most popular one involves a woman overseeing the project who follows a fortune teller's advice and orders workers to mix children's blood with the bridge's foundation. A river fairy curses the woman and causes the woman to grow foul-smelling scales on her legs.

Incidents 
 On 22 September 2002, a barge rammed into a concrete foundation of the bridge causing a ₱25-million damage. Then, on October, A portion of the bridge slid down by at least 10 centimeters after a metal support for its concrete foundation gave way, which was attributed by Engineer Jimmy Chan to "material fatigue".

See also
List of longest bridges

References

External links

Truss bridges
Bridges in the Philippines
Bridges completed in 1973
Buildings and structures in Tacloban
Buildings and structures in Samar (province)
Japan–Philippines relations